Barbados is scheduled to compete at the 2023 Pan American Games in Santiago, Chile from October 20 to November 5, 2023. This will be Barbados' 16th appearance at the Pan American Games, having competed at every edition of the games since the nation's debut, in 1963.

Competitors
The following is the list of number of competitors (per gender) participating at the games per sport/discipline.

Shooting

Barbados qualified a total of four shooters at the 2022 Americas Shooting Championships.

Shotgun

See also
Barbados at the 2024 Summer Olympics

References

Nations at the 2023 Pan American Games
2023
2023 in Barbadian sport